Poems for the Hazara() is a multilingual poetry anthology and a collaborative poem composed of the works of one hundred twenty five internationally recognized poets from sixty-eight countries. Poems in this book are in English, Spanish, Catalan, Japanese, Norwegian, Turkish, Hazaragi, Italian, Greek, German, Irish, Hebrew, Romanian, French, Armenian, Hungarian and Portuguese. All non-English poems have been translated into English.  "Poems for the Hazara" includes the poetry anthology and a collaborative poem (Collaborative poetry) featuring contributions from 23 international poets.  An open letter from 354 celebrated poets including Nobel, Pulitzer, continental and national literary prize winners as well as presidents of PEN clubs, and writers associations from 97 countries is included at the end. This letter is addressed to world leaders in support of the Hazara people. The executive editor is Hazara poet, journalist and human rights activist, Kamran Mir Hazar.

Poets
Etnairis Ribera, Puerto Rico
Angelina Llongueras, Catalonia
Aju Mukhopadhyay, Pondicherry, India
Ban'ya Natsuishi, Japan
Julio Pavanetti, Uruguay/ Spain
Gertrude Fester, Rwanda/South Africa 
Jack Hirschman, United States
Iztok Osojnik, Slovenia
Erling Kittelsen, Norway
Obediah Michael Smith, Bahamas
Bina Sarkar Ellias, India
Raúl Henao, Colombia
Anne Waldman, United States
Nguyen Quang Thieu, Vietnam
Timo Berger, Germany
Elsa Tió, Puerto Rico
Kamran Mir Hazar, Hazaristan
Rodrigo Verdugo, Chile
Mildred Kiconco Barya, Uganda
Stefaan Van Den Bremt, Flanders, Belgium
Winston Morales Chavarro, Colombia
Esteban Valdés Arzate, Mexico
Akwasi Aidoo, Ghana/United States
Yolanda Pantin, Venezuela
Yiorgos Chouliaras, Greece
James O'Hara, Mexico, United States and Ireland
Raquel Chalfi, Israel
Jim Byron, United States
Luisa Vicioso Sánchez, Dominican Republic
Andrea Garbin, Italy
Luz Helena Cordero Villamizar, Colombia
Peter Voelker, Germany
Zoran Anchevski, Macedonia
Naotaka Uematsu, Japan
Paul Disnard, Colombia
Vyacheslav Kupriyanov, Russia
Gabriel Rosenstock, Ireland
Maruja Vieira, Colombia
Nyein Way, Myanmar
Gaston Bellemare, Québec
Zohra Hamid, South Africa
Amir Or, Israel
Ivan Djeparoski, Macedonia
Attila F. Balázs, Slovakia
Ioana Trica, Romania
Michaël Glück, France
Quito Nicolaas, Netherlands
Noria Adel, Algeria
Francisco Sánchez Jiménez, Colombia
Werewere Liking, Cameroon/Ivory Coast
Beppe Costa, Italy
William Pérez Vega, Puerto Rico
Fanny Moreno, Colombia
John Curl, United States
Kevin Kiely, Ireland
Azam Abidov, Uzbekistan
Luis Galar (No Country)
Santiago B. Villafania, Philippines
Althea Romeo-Mark, Antigua
Bengt Berg, Sweden
Luz Lescure, Panama
Lola Koundakjian, Armenia
Zindzi Mandela, South Africa
Edvino Ugolini, Italy
Jean-Claude Awono, Cameroon
Stefania Battistella, Italy
Eugenia Sánchez Nieto, Colombia
Alina Beatrice Chesca, Romania
Simón Zavala Guzmán, Ecuador
Ostap Nozhak, Ukraine
Berry Heart, Botswana
Gilma De Los Ríos, Colombia
Laura Hernandez Muñoz, México
Mamang Dai, India
Erkut Tokman, Turkey
Álvaro Miranda, Colombia
Claus Ankersen, Denmark
Mark Lipman, United States
John Hegley, England
Micere Githae Mugo, Kenya
Germain Droogenbroodt, Belgium/Spain
Fiyinfoluwa Onarinde, Nigeria
Ataol Behramoğlu, Turkey
Khal Torabully, Mauritius/France
Jorge Boccanera, Argentina
Kama Sywor Kamanda, DR Congo
Bineesh Puthuppanam, India
Iris Miranda, Puerto Rico
Pamela Ateka, Kenya
Fahredin Shehu, Kosovo
Tamer Öncul, Cyprus
Tânia Tomé, Mozambique
Howard A. Fergus, Montserrat, West Indies
Janak Sapkota, Nepal
Károly Fellinger, Hungary
Alfred Tembo, Zambia
Emilce Strucchi, Argentina
Juan Diego Tamayo, Colombia
Manuel Silva Acevedo, Chile
Elias Letelier, Chile
Mohammed Bennis, Morocco
Károly Sándor Pallai, Hungary
Edgardo Nieves-Mieles, Puerto Rico
Fatoumata Ba, Mali
Vupenyu Otis Zvoushe, Zimbabwe
Santosh Alex, India
Silvana Berki, Albania/Finland
Hussein Habasch, Kurdistan, Syria
Lucy Cristina Chau, Panamá
Jessie Kleemann, Greenland
Siki Dlanga, South Africa
Irena Matijašević, Croatia
Boel Schenlaer, Sweden
Merlie M. Alunan, Philippines
Ernesto P. Santiago, Philippines
Rassool Snyman, South Africa
Mary Smith, Scotland
K. Satchidanandan, India
Sukrita Paul Kumar, India
Birgitta Jónsdóttir, Iceland
Zelma White, Montserrat, British West Indies
Navkirat Sodhi, India
Gémino H. Abad, Philippines
Mbizo Chirasha, Zimbabwe
Joyce Ashuntantang, Cameroon/ United States

Cover
Photograph of Buddha in Bamiyan, courtesy of Najibullah Mosafer. Kamran Mir Hazar proposed the flag of Hazaristan.

In other media 
Poems for the Hazara was recently discussed on episode 035 of the podcast The Wikicast.

References

External links 
 Poems for the Hazara on Amazon (Paperback)
 Poems for the Hazara on Amazon (Hardcover)
 Official website of the poets world-wide supporting the Hazara
 
 Poems for the Hazara – Poets and Readers/ Photo Album

2014 poetry books
Poetry anthologies
Collaborative poetry

Hazara people-related books
Hazarajat